General elections were held in the Territory of Papua and New Guinea between 15 February and 15 March 1964. They were the first elections in the territory held under universal suffrage. Voter turnout among enrolled voters was 65%.

Background
In March 1962 the Papua New Guinea Select Committee on Political Development was set up to identify future amendments to political arrangements in the territory. Following the visit of a United Nations mission that proposed a 100-member legislature, the committee toured the territory in September and October, taking evidence from over 450 residents. An interim report was presented to the Legislative Council in October, and subsequently approved by the Australian government.

The 37-member Legislative Council (which had only twelve elected members) was replaced with a 64-member House of Assembly. The new legislature had 10 official members (civil servants) and 54 elected members, of which 10 were elected from reserved constituencies in which only Europeans (who numbered around 25,000 of the total population of around two million) could be candidates; Europeans could also run in the non-reserved constituencies. Voters cast two votes; one for a general constituency candidate and one for a reserved constituency candidate. The voting age was set at 21. The electoral roll was created over several months in 1963, with field staff of the Native Affairs Department visiting over 12,000 villages and recording the names of all adults in the territory, except in an area of 6,000 square miles that were classed as "restricted" due to the likelihood of being attacked by the inhabitants. A total of 1,029,192 voters were registered.

Candidates were required to have lived in their constituency for at least 12 months, and to have a home there. A preferential voting system was used, with candidates required to gain a majority to be elected.

Campaign
A total of 299 candidates contested the 54 seats, of which 238 were indigenous and 61 Europeans; 31 of the Europeans contested the 10 reserved seats and 30 ran in the general constituencies. One seat – North Markham Reserved – had only one candidate (Horrie Niall), who was elected unopposed.

Ten of the twelve MLCs elected in 1961 ran for re-election, with only John Chipper and Paul Mason not standing. Three of the candidates for the general constituencies were former or present cargo cult leaders, Francis Hagai, Paliau Maloat and Yali. Although Yali ran in the Rai Coast constituency, numerous voters in the neighbouring Madang constituency attempted to vote for him, submitting blank votes after being told he was not on their ballot.

Results
Of the 44 open constituencies, 38 were won by indigenous candidates and six by Europeans. 35 of the 38 indigenous members were new to the legislature, with only Nicholas Brokam, John Guise and Pita Simogun having previously been members of the Legislative Council. Four of the 16 Europeans had previously been MLCs.

Preference votes only changed the result in five of the 44 open constituencies.

Official members

Aftermath
Following the elections, the requirement under electoral law for candidates to achieve an absolute majority of votes in their constituency to be elected became a controversial issue; as many voters did not use their preference votes, there were 32 constituencies where no candidate achieved a majority. In April Mick Casey, a losing candidate in South Markham, notified the Electoral officer that he intended to file an appeal. However, Casey did not file his appeal, and the electoral law was amended on 16 June to remove the requirement for an absolute majority.

When the new House of Assembly met for the first time on 8 June, Horrie Niall was elected Speaker unopposed. One of the first decisions made was that only English, Tok Pisin and Hiri Motu would be used in the Assembly, after Handabe Tiabe (who spoke none of the three languages) attempted to bring his translator into the chamber.

The Administrator Donald Cleland subsequently appointed an Administrator's Council and ten Parliamentary Under-Secretaries from amongst the indigenous members.

See also
Members of the House of Assembly of Papua and New Guinea, 1964–1968

References

External links
The Papua-New Guinea Elections 1964 The Australian National University

Papua
1964 in Papua New Guinea
Elections in Papua New Guinea
February 1964 events in Oceania
March 1964 events in Oceania
Election and referendum articles with incomplete results